Dagu may refer to:

 Nyala language (Sudan), also known as Dagu, an Eastern Sudanic language of Darfur
 Daju people

China
Dagu Subdistrict (大沽街道), a subdistrict in Binhai, Tianjin
Taku Forts, also known as Dagu Forts, historical coastal forts located in Binhai
Dagu, Sichuan (打古), a town in Naxi District, Luzhou, Sichuan
Dagu Township (大沽乡), a township in Ningdu County, Jiangxi
Dagu River, a river in Shandong

Chinese culture
 Dagu (instrument) (大鼓), a bass drum, see List of Chinese musical instruments
 Dagu (music), a form of Shuochang, or storytelling accompanied by music

See also
 Battle of Dagu Forts (1900), or Battle of Taku Forts, a conflict during the Boxer Rebellion
 Daguan (disambiguation)
 Degu (disambiguation)
 Dogu (disambiguation)
 Dugu (disambiguation)